Nikitas Kocheilas (born 1 March 1983) is a Greek water polo player. As a member of Greece men's national water polo team, he won the bronze medal at the 2006 FINA World League and competed at the 2006 European Championship, the 2006 FINA World Cup and the 2008 FINA World League. Kocheilas was also part of the Greece men's national water polo team that was the Champion at the 2001 Junior World Championship in Istanbul.

At club level, Kocheilas played most notably for Greece powerhouse Olympiacos from 2004 to 2011, winning 6 Greek Championships (2005, 2007–2011), 6 Greek Cups (2006, 2007–2011) and the fourth place at the 2006–07 LEN Euroleague.

References

Greek male water polo players
1983 births
Living people
Olympiacos Water Polo Club players

Ethnikos Piraeus Water Polo Club players